A basketball uniform is a type of uniform worn by basketball players. Basketball uniforms consist of a jersey that features the number and last name of the player on the back, as well as shorts and athletic shoes. Within teams, players wear uniforms representing the team colors; the home team typically wears a lighter-colored uniform, while the visiting team wears a darker-colored uniform.

Different basketball leagues have different specifications for the type of uniform that is allowed on the court. Early in the history of the sport, basketball was played in any type of athletic attire, but by the 1900s, special uniforms were developed and marketed to basketball players. The style, cut, and fit of basketball uniforms evolved throughout subsequent decades, often modeled after the general fashion trends of the day.

History

Jerseys and shorts

Originally, basketball was played in any type of athletic attire, ranging from track suits to football uniforms. The first official basketball uniforms, as displayed in the Spalding catalog of 1901, featured three types of pants: knee-length padded pants, similar to those worn for playing football, as well as shorter pants and knee-length tights. There were two types of suggested jersey, a quarter-length sleeve and a sleeveless version. 

The long pants later evolved into medium-length shorts in the 1920s, and by the 1930s, the material used for jerseys changed from heavy wool to the lighter polyester and nylon. In the 1970s and 80s, uniforms became tighter-fitting and shorts were shorter, consistent with the overall fashion trends of these two decades. At this time, women's basketball uniforms transitioned from longer-sleeved uniforms to tank-top style jerseys similar to men's basketball uniforms, which more explicitly showed off players' muscle tone.

In 1984, Michael Jordan asked for longer shorts and helped popularize the move away from tight, short shorts toward the longer, baggier shorts worn by basketball players today. Throughout the 1990s, basketball uniforms fell under the influence of hip hop culture, with shorts becoming longer and looser-fitting, team colors brighter, and designs more flashy and suggestive of rappers' bling. At the turn of the 21st century, basketball uniforms became even more oversized and loose-fitting; the arm holes in women's basketball jerseys remained smaller than men's, but were wide enough to reveal the players' sports bras.

Sleeved jersey
For the Christmas Day games of 2013, the NBA and its apparel partner Adidas introduced a newly designed sleeved jersey with large team and NBA logos on the front. Marketers for the new uniforms realized that fans were unwilling to wear sleeveless jerseys in their day-to-day life and hoped the new sleeved jerseys would be more popular for everyday wear. However, it was also a "not-so-well-kept secret that the NBA wanted to implement jersey ads in the years following the introduction of sleeved jerseys" as the "sleeves allow more space for potential partners to add their corporate logos to jerseys" like association football (soccer). After the league deal with Adidas expired and Nike signed on as the new apparel partner, the sleeved jersey did not continue.

The sleeved jersey was controversial among players.  LeBron James famously ripped the sleeves off during a prime time game against the New York Knicks in 2015, but in the 2016 NBA Finals James convinced his teammates to wear the sleeved jerseys in Game 5 and again in the title-clinching Game 7.

Shoes
In 1903, a special basketball shoe with suction cups to prevent slippage was added to the official basketball uniform demonstrated in the Spalding catalog. 
Over the decades, different shoe brands and styles were popular as basketball shoes: Chuck Taylor All-Stars and Keds in the 1960s and 1970s; Adidas and Nike leather high-tops in the late 1970s and 1980s; and Air Jordans in the 1990s.

Accessories
In the 1970s, Slick Watts and Bill Walton began to wear headbands, which soon became popular with other players. Rick Barry popularized wrist-bands, and other players soon created variations, such as bands that covered their forearms or biceps. These were used to wipe off sweat, or simply worn as fashion statements.

Modern day

United States basketball

Rules and regulations
In professional basketball leagues today, teams playing at home typically wear lighter-colored uniforms than the visiting team. The home team is now allowed to wear any uniform color it chooses, while its opponent may wear any color that sufficiently contrasts with the home team's choice.

In the NBA, basketball shorts must fall at least 1 inch above the knee, and T-shirts cannot be worn under the jersey – however, they are permitted in American college basketball. Some NBA and WNBA teams have allowed sponsors' logos to appear on their uniforms.

Material
Uniforms are made of wicking material designed to absorb sweat and ensure that it evaporates faster. They are the product of a four-year study researching professional basketball players, who identified the need for fewer seams, lighter weight, and faster drying and cooling in their jerseys.

International basketball leagues
The main difference between U.S. basketball uniforms and those of other countries is the appearance of sponsorship iconography; European basketball uniforms are often covered in the logos of their sponsors (similar to association football), while the U.S. uniforms (like other major U.S. pro sports) feature the team wordmark/logo front and center. 

For the 2017–18 season, some U.S. teams have started putting sponsorship logos on their jerseys on the upper left of the jersey which is a maximum of 2.5 inches by 2.5 inches.

See also
Sportswear (activewear)

References

External links

Basketball uniforms
Uni
History of basketball